The 2010–11 Welsh Premier League was the 19th season of the Welsh Premier League since its establishment in 1992 as the League of Wales. It was reduced to a size of 12 teams from this season following a unanimous decision by the Premier League clubs in June 2009. The league season began on 13 August 2010 and ended on 30 April 2011. The New Saints were the defending champions, but lost their crown to Bangor City.

Teams
Rhyl were denied the domestic licence for competing in this season's Welsh Premier League and were therefore relegated to the second tier. Welsh Premier League aspirants Llangefni Town (Cymru Alliance) and Afan Lido (Welsh Football League First Division) were also denied licences meaning that no team from the second tier was promoted. Since these three teams failed to obtain licences, the best three teams originally to be relegated, with all three obtaining their licences, were spared from relegation (Bala Town, Haverfordwest County and Newtown). Rhyl became the third Championship winning side to be relegated after Barry Town and Cwmbran Town. Rhyl had had the highest home attendances in the league for the last seven seasons.

Team summaries

Managerial changes

League table

Results
Teams played each other twice on a home and away basis, before the league split into two groups - the top six and the bottom six.
Clubs in these groups played each other twice again to bring the total fixture count to 32.
This meant a decrease in fixtures from 34 games to 32 from the previous season.

Matches 1–22

Matches 23–32

Top six

Bottom six

UEFA Europa League play-offs
As Llanelli AFC had already been assured of a Europa League spot by virtue of playing in the 2010–11 Welsh Cup Final against Champions-League qualified Bangor City, third-placed Neath and fifth- through eighth-placed sides Port Talbot Town, Prestatyn Town, Aberystwyth Town and Airbus UK Broughton competed in the inaugural play-offs for the second 2011–12 UEFA Europa League spot available via league placement. The winners of this play-off would go on to enter the Europa League in the first qualifying round.

Quarterfinal
Aberystwyth Town and Airbus UK Broughton, as worst-placed teams of the play-off participants, had to compete an extra match in order to reduce the teams for the semi-finals to four. The winners of this match would face Neath in the semi-final.

Semifinals

The semi-finals were held simultaneously on 15 May. Aberystwyth Town, having beaten Airbus, faced third-placed Neath in the first, while fifth-placed Prestatyn faced off against sixth-placed Port Talbot in the other.

Final

The final was held at Neath's Gnoll, as they had finished higher than Prestatyn in the league and had therefore 'earned' home advantage. Neath won the game 3-2 and will play in the Europa League next season as a result.

Top goalscorers
Including matches played on 18 February 2011; Source: Soccerway

References

External links
 Welsh Premier League Football
 2010–11 Welsh Premier League at Soccerway

Cymru Premier seasons
1